Sir Tomasi Puapua  (born 10 September 1938) is a political figure who represented Vaitupu in the Parliament of Tuvalu. He attended the Fiji School of Medicine and the Otago University Medical School. He married Riana Puapua.

Prime minister

He was the second Prime Minister of Tuvalu from 8 September 1981 to 16 October 1989. In a country which sees frequent changes among its head of government, Puapua is noted for having been the hitherto longest serving Prime Minister.

The first elections after independence will not held until 8 September 1981. 26 candidates contested the 12 seats. Dr. Tomasi Puapua, was elected as prime minister with a 7:5 majority over the group a members of parliament headed by former Prime Minister Toaripi Lauti. Tomasi Puapua was re-elected in the general election held on 12 September 1985 continued as Prime Minister,

The next general election was held on 26 March 1989. In the subsequent parliament the members elected Bikenibeu Paeniu.

Following the general election that was held on 25 November 1993 the members of parliament were evenly split in their support of the incumbent Prime Minister Bikenibeu Paeniu and Tomasi Puapua. As a consequence, the Governor-General dissolved the parliament on 22 September and a further election took place on 25 November 1993. The subsequent parliament elected Kamuta Latasi as prime minister on 10 December 1993.

Speaker
He was elected Speaker of the Parliament of Tuvalu (Palamene o Tuvalu) during government of Kamuta Latasi from 1993 to 1998.

Governor-General

Having exercised the senior executive office for many years, Puapua later served as Governor-General of Tuvalu as the representative of Elizabeth II, Queen of Tuvalu from 1998 to 2003, which is a higher office in protocol terms, but is more ceremonial in nature.

Commonwealth honours
In 1998 he was made a Knight Commander of the Most Excellent Order of the British Empire (KBE) for services to medicine, politics and the community.

In 2002 Puapua was appointed to the Order of St Michael and St George and the Privy Council.

References

1938 births
Living people
Governors-General of Tuvalu
Knights Grand Cross of the Order of St Michael and St George
Knights Commander of the Order of the British Empire
Members of the Privy Council of the United Kingdom
Prime Ministers of Tuvalu
Speakers of the Parliament of Tuvalu